There are over 20,000 Grade II* listed buildings in England. This page is a list of these buildings in the district of Tendring in Essex.

Tendring

|}

Notes

External links

Lists of Grade II* listed buildings in Essex
 
Tendring